Mashco Piro is an Arawakan language spoken in Peru. It is also called Cujareño. It is very similar to the Piro, with an estimated 60% inherent intelligibility. Kaufman considered it a dialect of Piro; Aikhenvald suggests it may rather be a dialect of Iñapari.

Language documentation is limited, since the Mascho Piro are highly nomadic hunter-gatherers who avoid contact with outsiders. The name Cujareño has been associated with the Panoan languages, though without much evidence.

Notes

Arawakan languages
Languages of Peru